Olive Mamak Innakatsik (1915–1994) was an Inuit artist.

Her work is included in the collections of the National Gallery of Canada, the Art Gallery of Guelph, the Norman Zepp / Judith Varga Collection at the University of Saskatchewan and the Winnipeg Art Gallery.

References

 1915 births
 1994 deaths
20th-century Canadian artists
20th-century Canadian women artists
Inuit artists
Date of birth missing
Date of death missing